Harriet Margaret Ndow (née Njie; October 28, 1926 – 18 June, 2019) was a Gambian educator and educational entrepreneur.

Early life and education 
Ndow was born in 1926 as the first daughter of the shop owner William Njie and Elizabeth Njie. She belonged to the Wolof ethnic group and was Catholic. She had her primary and secondary education at St. Joseph's Infant Primary and Secondary schools. After graduating from school in 1945, she went to Achimota College in the Gold Coast (now Achimota School in Ghana ) with a scholarship to train as a primary school teacher.

Career 
Starting in the 1980s, with the support of the government and a World Bank loan of over $7 million, she founded several of her own schools, first the St. Joseph Nursery School and then secondary schools. In 2009, eight schools were part of their Ndow's Group of Schools. Among them is the Ndow's Comprehensive Senior Secondary School in Bakau New Town with 575 students from grades 10 to 12 (as of 2009).

Awards 
In 2014 she received a Lifetime Achievement Award from the Gambia Chamber of Commerce and Industry (GCCI).

Personal life 
Ndow was married to Chips Ndow.

References 

Gambian educators

1926 births
Alumni of Achimota School
2019 deaths